Ernest Orville Flatt (October 30, 1918 – June 10, 1995) was an American choreographer and dancer. He won an Primetime Emmy Award and was nominated for six more in the category Outstanding Choreography for his work on the television program The Carol Burnett Show. As a choreographer he also won a Christopher Award and a Golden Rose. Flatt was also nominated for two Tony Awards in the categories Best Direction of a Musical and Best Choreography.

Life and career 
In his younger years, Flatt worked on Broadway and in motion pictures such as An American in Paris (1951) and Singing' in the Rain (1952). Later, he turned to television where he had more success choreographing adaptations of Broadway musicals. Flatt worked with Judy Garland and Carol Burnett on their series The Carol Burnett Show.

Flatt died in June 1995 of an aortic hemorrhage in Taos, New Mexico, at the age of 76.

References

External links 

1918 births
1995 deaths
People from Denver
American choreographers
American dancers
American theatre people
Primetime Emmy Award winners